Cossatot River High School (CRHS) is a public high school in unincorporated Polk County, Arkansas, near Vandervoort and Cove. It is a part of the Cossatot River School District and serves Vandervoot, Cove, and Wickes.

The school, on a  plot of land opened in 2013. The building had a cost of $15 million. It was formed as a consolidation of Wickes High School and Van-Cove High School.

References

External links
 Cossatot River High School

Public high schools in Arkansas